Cambridge Information Group (CIG) is a privately held global investment firm focusing on information services, education and technology. It began as a firm providing services to academic publishers. It is headquartered in Bethesda, Maryland.

As of 2007, CIG's operating companies are ProQuest, R. R. Bowker, and CIG Education Group. CIG Education Group is the owner of the Sotheby's Institute of Art, and Bach to Rock music school (B2R). In 2016 CIG sold investments in Navtech and MetaMetrics. Robert Snyder's son Andrew is chief executive officer and his daughter Jill is director of communications. On December 1, 2021, Clarivate bought ProQuest from CIG for $5.3 billion. On June 10, 2022, CIG acquired Emerald Group Publishing.

History
CIG was founded in 1971 by Robert N. Snyder and Philip E. Hixon as a result of a merger of Cambridge Scientific Abstracts (CSA), Disclosure Incorporated, and National Standards Association. The latter were sold by 1993, and the core CSA reference work expanded into the social sciences, the arts and the humanities.

CIG purchased R. R. Bowker in 2001 and Sotheby's Institute of Art in 2003.

See also
ProQuest
CSA (database company)

References

External links
 Official website
 B2R - Bach to Rock website

Financial services companies established in 1971
1971 establishments in Maryland
Companies based in Bethesda, Maryland